David Keith (born October 18, 1973) is an American drummer, composer, and producer living in Hartford, Connecticut. He currently plays with Ritchie Blackmore's Rainbow and Blackmore's Night.

Biography 
David Keith was born in Hartford, Connecticut.  He began playing drums at age four, and went on to play with the Concert Jazz Band at William H. Hall High School in West Hartford, Connecticut. In 1996 he joined the popular progressive rock band Mighty Purple and toured with them throughout the United States.  In 2000 he joined the rhythm and blues, and swing band Eight to the Bar, touring the US and Europe through 2006.  In 2010 he created Mission Zero with his sister Chenot Keith (born Megan Keith).  In 2012 he joined Blackmore's Night, led by guitarist Ritchie Blackmore (Deep Purple; Ritchie Blackmore's Rainbow). In 2015, Ritchie Blackmore re-formed Ritchie Blackmore's Rainbow selecting David to play drums.

Styles and influences 
David enjoys playing various styles of music, including, but not limited to pop, rock, swing, R&B, soul, electronica, funk, industrial, and medieval folk rock.

Drumming influences include John Bonham, Neil Peart, Cozy Powell, Steve Gadd, Buddy Rich, Peter Erskine, Bernard Purdie, Stewart Copeland, Gene Krupa, Billy Cobham, as well as traditional African, Afro-Cuban, and American tribal drumming.

Musical influences include Jane's Addiction, The Police, Louis Prima, Steely Dan, Peter Gabriel, Massive Attack, Duran Duran, Horace Andy, Portishead, and Earth, Wind & Fire.

David currently endorses Ayotte drums, Aquarian drumheads, Vater drumsticks and Dream cymbals and gongs.

Discography 
Rainbow
 Rainbow: Memories in Rock II (2018)
 Rainbow: Memories in Rock, Live in Germany (2016)
 Live in Birmingham 2016 (2017)

Blackmore's Night
 Dancer and the Moon (2013)
 All Our Yesterdays (2015)

Mission Zero - Bruises on the Map (2011), Sky Candy (2013), People in Glass Yachts (2015), "Easy Tiger" (2017)

Boyan & Boyer feat. Mission Zero - Dj SS & Influx UK presents: DEEPSOUND VOL.2 / Formation Records, "Be Right Here" (2015)

Eight to the Bar - Hey, Sailor! (2001), Superhero Swinger Undercover (2003), You Call This Swing? (2005)

Mighty Purple - Live - Eli Whitney Barn (1997), Para Mejor O Peor (1998), How to Make a Living (2000)

.dbk. - .dbk. (2012)

My Brightest Diamond - Tear It Down (2007)

References

External links 

 Wallner, Will. "Bent Out Of Shape Show Review: Blackmore's Night Live in Berlin" Guitar World, September 1, 2014
 Cihak, Izzy. "Mission Zero: My Favorite Lounge Act" Philthy Mag, July 15, 2014
 Yung, Ben. "Mission Zero: People In Glass Yachts EP" The Revue, May 11, 2015
 Dauphinais, Jennifer. "Mission Zero: People In Glass Yachts" Local Band Review, April 22, 2015
 Mims, Dan. "Making Tracks" Daily Nutmeg, July 9, 2014
 Budnik, Dean. "Jam Bands: America's Hottest Live Groups" 1999
 New York Times. "" June 27, 1999
 O'Connell, Joshua. "Required Listening" 2015

1973 births
Living people
Musicians from Hartford, Connecticut
Musicians from New Haven, Connecticut
20th-century American drummers
American male drummers
21st-century American drummers
20th-century American male musicians
21st-century American male musicians